Michel Jourdain may refer to:

 Michel Jourdain Sr., CART driver
 Michel Jourdain Jr., CART & NASCAR driver